Renown may refer to:

 Celebrity, fame and broad public recognition

Companies
 Renown (company), a Japanese clothing brand
 Renown Health, a healthcare network in Nevada, US
 Renown Pictures, a British film company

Transport

Ships
 Renown (1794 ship), an American whaler
 Renown (German Barque), a 19th-century sailing cargo ship
 Renown-class battlecruiser, two Royal Navy ships of World War I
 HMS Renown, several ships of the Royal Navy

Other
 AEC Renown, a bus manufactured by the Associated Equipment Company 1962–1967
 LNWR Renown Class, a series of British steam locomotives 1897–1924
 Triumph Renown, a car manufactured by Triumph 1946–1954
 Wright Renown, a bus manufactured by Wrightbus 1997–2002

Sport
 Renown SC, a Sri Lankan association football club